Shingo Kunieda defeated the two-time defending champion Stéphane Houdet in the final, 6–4, 6–1 to win the men's singles wheelchair tennis title at the 2014 French Open. It was his fifth French Open singles title and 16th major singles title overall.

Seeds
  Shingo Kunieda (champion)
  Stéphane Houdet (final)

Draw

Finals

References
 Draw

Wheelchair Men's Singles
French Open, 2014 Men's Singles